The Women's 500 m time trial at the 2014 UCI Track Cycling World Championships was held on 27 February 2014. 16 cyclists participated in the contest.

Medalists

Results
The race was started at 18:30.

References

2014 UCI Track Cycling World Championships
UCI Track Cycling World Championships – Women's 500 m time trial